Galien may refer to the following:

Places in the United States
 Galien Township, Michigan, Berrien County 
 Galien, Michigan, a village in the township
 Galien River, in southwest Michigan

Other uses
 Galiens li Restorés, a chanson de geste about a hero named Galien
 Joseph Galien (1699-1762), French theologian and academic

See also
 Gallienus (218-268), Roman emperor
 René de Bréhant de Galinée (1645–1678), North American explorer
 Galen (disambiguation)
 Galan (disambiguation)